The 2023 season will be the Cleveland Browns' upcoming 71st season as a member of the National Football League, their 75th overall and their fourth under the head coach/general manager tandem of Kevin Stefanski and Andrew Berry. They will look to improve upon their 7–10 record from the previous season and make the playoffs for the first time since 2020.

Offseason

Staff changes
On January 9, the day after the 2022 season finale, the Browns fired defensive coordinator Joe Woods after three seasons.  

On January 18, the team hired former Tennessee Titans senior defensive assistant Jim Schwartz to replace Woods as defensive coordinator. Schwartz previously served as head coach of the Detroit Lions and defensive coordinator for the Titans and the Philadelphia Eagles, winning Super Bowl LII during his tenure with the latter.

On February 21, the Browns fired special teams coordinator Mike Priefer after four seasons. He had served as interim head coach for two games, including the Browns' playoff victory over the Pittsburgh Steelers in 2020.

On February 25, the Browns hired former Indianapolis Colts special teams coordinator Bubba Ventrone to the same position, as well as serving as assistant head coach. Ventrone played ten seasons as a safety and special teams specialist, including four seasons with the Browns.

Roster changes

Draft

Notes

Staff

Current roster

Preseason
The Browns' preseason opponents and schedule will be announced in the spring.

Regular season

2023 opponents
Listed below are the Browns' opponents for 2023. Exact dates and times will be announced in the spring.

References

External links
 

Cleveland
Cleveland Browns seasons
Cleveland Browns